Bletchingley was a parliamentary borough in Surrey. It returned two Members of Parliament (MPs) to the House of Commons of England from 1295 to 1707, to the House of Commons of Great Britain from 1707 to 1800, and to the House of Commons of the United Kingdom until 1832, when the constituency was abolished by the Great Reform Act.

Elections were held using the bloc vote system.

History
Bletchingley was one of the original boroughs enfranchised in the Model Parliament, and kept its status until the Reform Act. The borough consisted of the former market town of Bletchingley in Surrey, which by the 19th century had shrunk to a village. In 1831, the population of the borough was 513, and contained only 85 houses. It was a burgage borough, the right to vote being exercised by the owners or resident tenants of the 130 "burgage tenements" - no doubt at some point in history these were simply the inhabited houses of the town, but it was already an artificial franchise by the time it was disputed before the House of Commons in 1624, when it was settled that Bletchingley's burgage holders should keep the vote as they had "time out of mind"; by the 19th century of course, with more burgages in the borough than houses, the notion of its being a residential franchise was no more than a legal fiction.

Like other burgage boroughs, Bletchingley quickly fell into the hands of a single landowner who thereby had the safest of pocket boroughs. It was once the property of Henry VIII's rejected Queen, Anne of Cleves. From her it passed to Sir Thomas Cawarden, the Master of the Revels and from his heir to Lord Howard of Effingham, father of the future conqueror of the Spanish Armada, in about 1560. It then remained in Howard hands for more than half a century, one of several boroughs controlled by that powerful family.

However, the 1624 dispute occurred when the voters daringly defied Lady Howard, and it may not have been entirely secure for any single "patron" for the rest of the century. By 1700, there were two rival influences, the Evelyns of Godstone, who had succeeded in holding one of the seats for much of the preceding sixty years, and Sir Robert Clayton, a London banker who was said to be the wealthiest commoner in England, and who was now Lord of the Manor. Neither held a majority of the burgages, and there were still a fair number of independent voters. For some years, Evelyn and Clayton had to be content with choosing one MP each, and even then had to face some tightly contested votes, but after the accession of George I, Clayton's nephew and heir, William Clayton, managed to accumulate enough of the burgages in his own hands to squeeze out the Evelyn influence and eventually make his hold absolutely watertight. Since the importance of a man with the absolute power to nominate two Members of Parliament was not underestimated by 18th century governments, he quickly found himself dignified with a baronetcy.

The Claytons retained Bletchingley until 1779. In that year, short of money and with talk of parliamentary reform in the air, Sir Robert Clayton decided to realise the asset while it still had a value, and sold the reversion of his property at Bletchingley (which by now included all the burgages) to his cousin, John Kenrick, for £10,000. Once the prospect of parliamentary reform had receded, Clayton repented of his bargain and filed an action in Chancery against Kenrick, claiming that he had been "imposed upon" and had been paid quite an inadequate amount; but the court sympathised with Kenrick, and dismissed the action with costs.

Kenrick's son later sold the rights to William Russell for £60,000; and his grandson William Russell made seats available to some of the rising stars of the Whig party. They included two future Prime Ministers: Hon. William Lamb (Prime Minister as Lord Melbourne) and Lord Palmerston.

Bletchingley was abolished as a separate constituency by the Reform Act, the town being included in the Eastern division of Surrey thereafter.

Members of Parliament

1295-1640

1640-1832

Notes

Election results

Elections in the 1830s

 Caused by Mills' resignation

 Caused by Tennyson's appointment as Clerk of the Ordnance

References
Robert Beatson, A Chronological Register of Both Houses of Parliament (London: Longman, Hurst, Res & Orme, 1807) 
D Brunton & D H Pennington, Members of the Long Parliament (London: George Allen & Unwin, 1954)
Cobbett's Parliamentary history of England, from the Norman Conquest in 1066 to the year 1803 (London: Thomas Hansard, 1808) 
 David W Hayton, Stuart Handley and Eveline Cruickshanks, The History of Parliament: the House of Commons 1690-1715 (Cambridge: Cambridge University Press, 2002)
 Maija Jansson (ed.), Proceedings in Parliament, 1614 (House of Commons) (Philadelphia: American Philosophical Society, 1988) 
 Lewis Namier & John Brooke, The History of Parliament: The House of Commons 1754-1790 (London: HMSO, 1964)
 J. E. Neale, The Elizabethan House of Commons (London: Jonathan Cape, 1949)
 T. H. B. Oldfield, The Representative History of Great Britain and Ireland (London: Baldwin, Cradock & Joy, 1816)
 J Holladay Philbin, Parliamentary Representation 1832 - England and Wales (New Haven: Yale University Press, 1965)
Henry Stooks Smith, The Parliaments of England from 1715 to 1847 (2nd edition, edited by FWS Craig - Chichester: Parliamentary Reference Publications, 1973)
 Robert Walcott, English Politics in the Early Eighteenth Century (Oxford: Oxford University Press, 1956)

Parliamentary constituencies in South East England (historic)
Constituencies of the Parliament of the United Kingdom established in 1295
Constituencies of the Parliament of the United Kingdom disestablished in 1832
Rotten boroughs